Fred Reynolds (born August 20, 1960) is a retired American professional basketball player.

Attended the University of Texas at El Paso from 1979–80 through 1981–82 and 1983–84, sat out of the entire 1982–83 season because of a broken leg but bounced back to become a member of the gold medal-winning United States national team in the 1983 Pan American Games, Reynolds also played for the American squad that placed second to Russia in the 1982 World Basketball championships.

He was taken by the Washington Bullets in the second round of the 1984 NBA draft, has had European experience playing in Belgium and Spain.

External links
 Fred Reynold's Bio
 Fred Reynolds Player Profile

1960 births
Living people
African-American basketball players
American expatriate basketball people in Belgium
American expatriate basketball people in the Philippines
American expatriate basketball people in Spain
American men's basketball players
Basketball players at the 1983 Pan American Games
Basketball players from Texas
Medalists at the 1983 Pan American Games
Pan American Games gold medalists for the United States
Pan American Games medalists in basketball
Philippine Basketball Association imports
Shell Turbo Chargers players
Small forwards
United States men's national basketball team players
UTEP Miners men's basketball players
Washington Bullets draft picks
21st-century African-American people
20th-century African-American sportspeople
1982 FIBA World Championship players